The Gaelic name Caiseal may refer to:
Ringfort, a circular defensive fort.
Cashel (disambiguation), various places, mainly in Ireland
Caiseal Mor, an Australian fantasy author